Jerry Mulready (January 5, 1923 – June 3, 1976) was an American football end. He played for the Chicago Rockets in 1947.

References

1923 births
1976 deaths
Sportspeople from Fargo, North Dakota
Players of American football from North Dakota
American football ends
American football defensive ends
Minnesota Golden Gophers football players
North Dakota State Bison football players
Chicago Rockets players